Jean Yatove (1903–1978) was a French composer known for his film scores.  He collaborated on a number of occasions with the director  Willy Rozier between 1934 and 1976.

Selected filmography
 William Tell (1934)
 Bach the Detective (1936)
 The Secrets of the Red Sea (1937)
 56 Rue Pigalle (1949)
 Oriental Port (1950)
 Moumou (1951)
 The Convict (1951)
 Manina, the Girl in the Bikini (1952)
 Sergil Amongst the Girls (1952)
 The Damned Lovers (1952)
 The Adventurer of Chad (1953)
 My Childish Father (1953)
 Adam Is Eve (1954)
Your Turn, Callaghan (1955)
 More Whiskey for Callaghan (1955)
 Le désordre et la nuit (1958)
 Marie-Octobre (1959)
 The Gigolo (1960)
 Boulevard (1960)
 The Black Monocle (1961)
 The Seventh Juror (1962)
 The Eye of the Monocle (1962)

References

Bibliography
 Chion, Michel & Vinas, Monique . The Films of Jacques Tati. Guernica, 1997.
 Crisp, Colin. French Cinema—A Critical Filmography: Volume 2, 1940–1958. Indiana University Press, 2015.
 Dutton, Julian. Keeping Quiet: Visual Comedy in the Age of Sound. Andrews UK Limited, 2015.

External links

1903 births
1978 deaths
French composers
People from Indre-et-Loire